Nikolai Efimovich Varfolomeev (29 September 1890 – 8 May 1939) was a Soviet military commander and theoretician. He and Vladimir Triandafillov made significant contributions to the use of technology in deep offensive operations. Varfolomeev was one of the foremost military theorists teaching at the RKKA Military Academy. He was executed in 1939 during the Great Purge.

Deep operation 
Varfolomeev, unlike Triandafilov, was less concerned with developing the quantitative indices of deep battle, but rather the mechanics of the shock army's mission. Varfolomeev termed this as "launching an uninterrupted, deep and shattering blow" along the main axis of advance. Varfolomeev believed the shock army needed both firepower and mobility to destroy both enemy tactical defences, operational reserves and seize geographical targets or positions in harmony with other operationally independent, but strategically collaborative, offensives.

References

Bibliography 
 Brigade Commander Georgii Samoilovich Isserson. The Evolution of Operational Art. Translator: Bruce W. Menning. Combat Studies Institute Press. .
 Harrison, Richard W. The Russian Way of War: Operational Art 1904–1940. Lawrence, Kan.: University Press of Kansas, 2001. 

Soviet kombrigs
Military doctrines
Military strategists
Military theorists
1890 births
1939 deaths
Soviet military writers